Elise Allen is an American author, television producer and screenwriter. Allen is a New York Times best-selling author and an Emmy nominated writer, known for co-creating the animated series Rainbow Rangers, writing numerous scripts for the Barbie film series, co-writing Elixir with Hilary Duff and co-authoring the Gabby Duran & the Unsittables book series, which was turned into a series on the Disney Channel.

Filmography

Television

Film

Novels

References

External links
 

Living people
21st-century American screenwriters
American women screenwriters
American television writers
Showrunners
American women television writers
21st-century American women writers
American women television producers
Year of birth missing (living people)
20th-century American screenwriters
20th-century American women writers
Writers from Philadelphia
Screenwriters from Pennsylvania
Television producers from Pennsylvania